Dwarf sedge is a common name for several small sedges and may refer to:

Carex humilis, native to Europe
Carex paupera, native to Australia
Carex pumila, introduced to North America